Limey-Remenauville is a commune in the Meurthe-et-Moselle department in north-eastern France.

History

The origin of the name "Limey" is said to come from the Celtic word "lemos" meaning "elm [tree]". This particular tree was previously common in the area but has since disappeared.

The town has several memorials from the First World War.

See also
Communes of the Meurthe-et-Moselle department
Parc naturel régional de Lorraine

References

Limeyremenauville